Susanna Heikari (born 8 April 1977) is a Finnish former football midfielder. She played for FC Tikkurila, MPS and HJK in the Naisten Liiga, Portland Pilots in the NCAA and FC Zürich in the Swiss Nationalliiga, taking part in the Champions League with HJK and Zürich.

Nicknamed Suski, she was a member of the Finnish national team for eight years.

References

1977 births
Living people
Finnish women's footballers
Expatriate women's footballers in Switzerland
Expatriate women's soccer players in the United States
Kansallinen Liiga players
Helsingin Jalkapalloklubi (women) players
Finland women's international footballers
Portland Pilots women's soccer players
Finnish expatriate footballers
Finnish expatriate sportspeople in Switzerland
Swiss Women's Super League players
FC Zürich Frauen players
Women's association football midfielders
People from Salo, Finland
Sportspeople from Southwest Finland